The Union Budget of India, also referred to as the Annual Financial Statement in Article 112 of the Constitution of India, is the annual budget of the Republic of India. The Government presents it on the first day of February so that it could be materialised before the beginning of new financial year in April. Until 2016 it was presented on the last working day of February by the Finance Minister in Parliament. The budget division of the department of economic affairs (DEA) in the finance ministry is the nodal body responsible for producing the budget. It is presented by means of the Finance bill and the Appropriation bill has to be passed by Lok Sabha before it can come into effect on 1 April, the start of India's financial year.

An interim budget is not the same as a 'Vote on Account'. While a 'Vote on Account' deals only with the expenditure side of the government's budget. An interim budget is a complete set of accounts, including both expenditure and receipts. An interim budget gives the complete financial statement, very similar to a full budget. While the law does not disqualify the Union government from introducing tax changes, normally during an election year, successive governments have avoided making any major changes in income tax laws during an interim budget.

Since 1947, there have been a total of 73 annual budgets, 14 interim budgets and four special budgets, or mini-budgets.

Finance ministers who have presented the budget

Timeline
Morarji Desai has presented 10 budgets which is the highest count followed by P Chidambaram's 9 and Pranab Mukherjee's 8. Yashwant Sinha, Yashwantrao Chavan and C.D. Deshmukh have presented 7 budgets each while Manmohan Singh and T.T. Krishnamachari have presented 6 budgets, Nirmala Sitharaman has presented 5 budgets.

Notes:
1During Deshmukh's tenure the Budget papers were prepared in Hindi as well for the first time.
2Morarji Desai presented eight annual and two interim budgets.

Pre-liberalization
The first union budget of independent India was presented by R. K. Shanmukham Chetty on 26 November 1947. Total revenues stood at ₹171.15 crore, and the fiscal deficit was ₹24.59 crore. The total expenditure was estimated at ₹197.29 crore with Defence expenditure at ₹92.74 crore.

The union budgets for the fiscal years 1959–61 to 1963–64, inclusive of the interim budget for 1962–63, were presented by Morarji Desai. On 29 February in 1964 and 1968, he became the only finance minister to present the Union budget on his birthday. Desai presented budgets that included five annual budgets and an interim budget during his first term and three final budgets and one interim budget in his second tenure when he was both the Finance Minister and the Deputy Prime Minister of India. After Desai's resignation, Indira Gandhi, the then Prime Minister of India, took over the Ministry of Finance to become the first woman to hold the post of the Finance Minister.

Hirubhai M. Patel, presented the shortest budget speech for the interim budget of 1977, which was mere 800 words long. Pranab Mukherjee, the first Rajya Sabha member to hold the Finance portfolio, presented the annual budgets for the financial years 1982–83, 1983–84 and 1984–85. Rajiv Gandhi presented the budget for 1987–89, after V. P. Singh quit his government, and in the process became the third Prime Minister to present a budget after his mother and grandfather. N. D. Tiwari presented the budget for 1988–89, S. B. Chavan for 1989–90, while Madhu Dandawate presented the Union budget for 1990–91. Dr. Manmohan Singh became the Finance Minister and presented the interim budget for 1991-92 as elections were forced. Due to political developments, early elections were held in May 1991 following which the Indian National Congress returned to political power and Manmohan Singh, the Finance Minister, presented the budget for 1991–92.

Post-liberalization 

Manmohan Singh under P. V. Narasimha Rao, in his next annual budgets from 1992 to 1993, opened the economy, encouraged foreign investments and reduced peak import duty from 300 plus percent to 50 percent. After elections in 1996, a non-Congress ministry assumed office. Hence the financial budget for 1996-97 was presented by P. Chidambaram, who then belonged to Tamil Maanila Congress. Following a constitutional crisis when the I. K. Gujral Ministry was on its way out, a special session of Parliament was convened just to pass Chidambaram's 1997-98 budget. This budget was passed without a debate. After the general elections in March 1998 that led to the Bharatiya Janata Party forming the Central Government, Yashwant Sinha, the then Finance Minister in this government, presented the interim and final budgets for 1998–99. After general elections in 1999, Sinha again became the Finance Minister and presented four annual budgets from 1999–2000 to 2002–2003. Due to elections in May 2004, an interim budget was presented by Jaswant Singh.

The Union Budget of India for 2012–2013 was presented by Pranab Mukherjee, on 16 March 2012, which was the 7th budget of his career. These budgetary proposals would be applicable for financial year 1 April 2012 to 31 March 2013. The Union Budget of India for 2013–2014 was presented by P. Chidambaram on 28 February 2013. The Interim Union Budget for 2014–2015 was presented on 17 February 2014. The Union Budget of India for 2014–2019 was presented by Arun Jaitley. The Interim Union Budget for 2019–2020 was presented by Piyush Goyal. The Union Budget for 2019–2023 was presented by Nirmala Sitharaman.

Traditions

Time of  budget announcement
Until the year 1999, the Union Budget was announced at 5:00 pm on the last working day of the month of February. This practice was inherited from the colonial era. Actual agenda behind this tradition was that, it gives Britishers the time of 11:30 am, a relax time at their location. This clearly shows their colonial era mindset they had left on Indian politicians.Another reason was that until the 1990s, all that budgets seem to do was to raise taxes, a presentation in the evening gave producers and the tax collecting agencies the night to work out the change in prices. It was Yashwant Sinha, the then Finance Minister of India in the NDA government (led by Bharatiya Janata Party) under Prime Minister Atal Bihari Vajpayee, who changed the ritual by announcing the 1999 Union Budget at 11 am. The tradition started from 2001.

Date of budget announcement
Also again in 2017, departing from the colonial-era tradition of presenting the Union Budget on the last working day of February, Minister of Finance (India) Arun Jaitley, in the NDA government (led by Bharatiya Janata Party) of Narendra Modi announced that it will now be presented on 1 February. Additionally Rail Budget, presented separately for 92 Years, merged with union budget.

Halwa ceremony and budget briefcase
The printing of budget documents starts roughly one week ahead of presenting in the Parliament with a customary 'Halwa ceremony' in which halwa (a sweet dish) is prepared in large quantities and served to the officers and support staff involved. They remain isolated and stay in the North Block office until the Budget is presented. The halwa is served by the Finance Minister. This ceremony is performed as a part of the Indian tradition of having something sweet before starting an important work.However in 2022 the tradition of halwa making was not followed and the status of it is unclear in future 

Until 2018, as a part of tradition, Finance ministers carried the budget in a leather briefcase. The tradition was established by the first Finance minister of India, R. K. Shanmukham Chetty. On 5 July 2019, Nirmala Sitharaman, broke this tradition by carrying the budget in a Bahi-Khata.

Change in Bahi Khata
On 1 February 2021, Finance Minister Nirmala Sitharaman presented the first paperless budget. This was done due to the ongoing COVID-19 pandemic in India.

With this move, 'bahi khata' (a ledger wrapped in red cloth) has been completely removed from this year. It is also considered a move to strengthen Prime Minister Narendra Modi's ambitious Digital India mission.

List of Union Budgets

See also
Military budget of India
Railway budget of India
Indian Economy

References

External links
 Indian Budget by Ministry of Finance
 Economic Survey and Union Budget
 List of Budget Speeches (since 1947)